The Hauka movement was a religious movement which arose in French Colonial Africa. It consisted of ceremonies, including mimicry and dancing, in which the participants performed the elaborate military ceremonies of their colonial occupiers. It was depicted in Les maîtres fous (The Mad Masters – 1955), a short film directed by Jean Rouch, a well-known French film director and ethnologist.

According to some anthropologists, the movement was a form of resistance that began in Niger, but spread to other parts of Africa. They say this pageant, though historic, was largely done to mock the settlers' authority by stealing their powers. Hauka members were not trying to emulate Europeans, but were trying to extract their life force. 

This stance has been heavily criticized by anthropologist James G. Ferguson, who finds this imitation not about importing colonialism into indigenous culture, but as a way to gain rights and status in the colonial society. The adoption of European customs was not a form of resistance, but to be “respected by the Europeans.”

See also
 Cargo cult
 Ghost dance

References

External links
 Les Maîtres Fous on YouTube.
 Les Maîtres Fous – article at Documentary (Educational Resources)
 The Poesis of Mimesis in Les Maîtres Fous – article by Prerana Reddy
 The Ethnographer's Eye: Ways of Seeing in Anthropology – article by Anna Grimshaw
 Les Maîtres Fous – article by Natalie Mildbrodt
 
 International Jean Rouch SYMPOSIUM (Society of Visual Anthropology)

French colonial empire
Religion in Africa